Bompard may refer to:

People with the surname

Alexandre Bompard (born 1972), French businessman
Frédéric Bompard (born 1962), French football player and manager
 Gabrielle Bompard, accused of murder in the Gouffé Case
Henri Bompard (1821–1906), French industrialist and politician
Jacques Bompard (born 1943), French politician
Manuel Bompard (born 1986), French politician
Maurice Bompard (politician) (1854–1935), French diplomat and later politician
Maximin de Bompart (1698–1773), French naval officer of the eighteenth century

Other

Bompard, Marseille, part of the 7th arrondissement of Marseille, France
Trophée Eric Bompard, international, senior-level annual figure skating competition in Paris, France:
2004 Trophée Eric Bompard
2005 Trophée Eric Bompard
2006 Trophée Eric Bompard
2007 Trophée Eric Bompard
2008 Trophée Eric Bompard

French-language surnames